Political debates about the United States federal budget discusses some of the more significant U.S. budgetary debates of the 21st century. These include the causes of debt increases, the impact of tax cuts, specific events such as the United States fiscal cliff, the effectiveness of stimulus, and the impact of the Great Recession, among others. The article explains how to analyze the U.S. budget as well as the competing economic schools of thought that support the budgetary positions of the major parties.

Overview

Many of the debates about the United States federal budget center on competing macroeconomic schools of thought. In general, Democrats favor the principles of Keynesian economics to encourage economic growth via a mixed economy of both private and public enterprise, and strong regulatory oversight. Conversely, Republicans generally support applying the principles of either laissez-faire or supply-side economics to grow the economy via small government, low taxes, limited regulation, and free enterprise. Debates have surrounded the appropriate size and role of the federal government since the founding of the country. These debates also deal with questions of morality, income equality and intergenerational equity. For example, Congress adding to the debt today may or may not enhance the quality of life for future generations, who may also have to bear additional interest and taxation burdens.

Political realities make major budgetary deals difficult to achieve. While Republicans argue conceptually for tax cuts for the wealthy and reductions in Medicare and Social Security, they are hesitant to actually vote to reduce the benefits from these popular programs. Democrats on the other hand argue conceptually for tax increases on the wealthy and a stronger social safety net. The so-called budgetary "grand bargain" of tax hikes on the rich and removal of some popular tax deductions in exchange for reductions to Medicare and Social Security spending is therefore elusive.

Debates following the 2008–2009 recession and resulting slow economic growth and high unemployment centered on the prioritization of job creation and economic stimulus versus the need to address significant budget deficits. Concerns regarding the economic impact of significant deficit reductions forecast for 2013 (dubbed the "fiscal cliff") were addressed by the American Taxpayer Relief Act of 2012, which included: a) the expiration of the Bush tax cuts for only the top 1% of income earners; b) the end of the Obama payroll tax cuts; and c) a sequester (cap) on spending for the military and other discretionary categories of spending. The deficit faded as a major issue for the remainder of President Obama's tenure, as the deficit returned to its historical average relative to GDP by 2014 as the economy recovered.

President Donald Trump has proposed policies including significant tax cuts and increased spending on defense and infrastructure. The Committee for a Responsible Federal Budget and Moody's Analytics reported in 2016 that enacting these policies would dramatically increase the annual budget deficits and national debt over the 2017–2026 periods, relative to the current policy baseline, which already includes a sizable debt increase.

Analyzing the budget

Before analyzing the budget debates, some background on the key terms used and sources of information may be helpful. The definitive analysis of the federal budget is performed by the Congressional Budget Office (CBO), which is the non-partisan organization charged with evaluating the budgetary and economic impact of legislation for the U.S. Congress. The CBO provides reports on specific legislation, as well as overall analyses of the budget and economy. For example, the annual "CBO Budget and Economic Outlook" covers recent historical information as well as revenue, expense, deficit, and debt projections for a ten-year forecast period. It also includes economic projections, as budgetary results are related to economic results. The CBO provides a "current law baseline" which assumes current laws are executed as written (e.g., tax cuts expire at the date legislated), as well as "current policy baselines" which assume current policies continue indefinitely. It also provides historical information in supplemental tables. Since the federal budget and economic variables are so large (trillions of dollars), CBO also measures many key variables relative to the GDP, a measure of the size of the economy. CBO uses an array of graphics to help explain their analyses, several examples of which are included in this article. CBO evaluates each fiscal year (FY), which runs October 1 to September 30.

For example, the CBO and Treasury Departments reported that:
 Federal spending increased significantly from $3.0 trillion in FY2008 to $3.5 trillion in FY2009, the last fiscal year budgeted by President Bush, which overlapped with President Obama's first year in office. This increase was primarily due to the Great Recession, which significantly increased automatic stabilizer spending (e.g., unemployment compensation, food stamps, and disability payments) which are made to eligible parties, without any legislative action. Spending then roughly stabilized at that dollar level for the remainder of his two terms. During 2015, the U.S. federal government spent $3.7 trillion, around the historical average relative to the size of the economy at 20.7% GDP. Projecting 2008 federal spending forward at the historical 5% rate, by 2015 it was $500 billion below trend.
 Revenue fell from $2.5 trillion in FY 2008 to $2.1 trillion in 2009, roughly $400 billion or 20%, as economic activity slowed due to the Great Recession. Measured as a % GDP, revenue in 2009 was the lowest in 50 years at 14.6% GDP. Revenue then began to recover as the economy did, returning to the historical average of 17.4% GDP by 2014.
 The budget deficit reached 10.8% GDP in 2009 in the depths of the recession, before steadily recovering to 2.5% GDP by 2015, below the historical average (1970–2015) of 2.8% GDP.
 The national debt increased from $10.0 trillion in September 2008 to $19.6 trillion in September 2016. Roughly $3 trillion of this increase was anticipated in the January 2009 CBO baseline forecast, or $6–8 trillion adjusting for the extension of the Bush tax cuts and other baseline overrides typically legislated. Obama ultimately extended the Bush tax cuts for approximately 98% of taxpayers as part of the American Taxpayer Relief Act of 2012, allowing taxes to rise on the top 1–2% of income earners. The debt held by the public (which excludes intra-governmental liabilities like the Social Security Trust Fund) rose from around 36% GDP in 2009 to 76% GDP by 2016, the highest level except for the post World War 2 era, mainly due to the economic impact of the Great Recession and the extension of the Bush tax cuts.

The CBO also provides a long term forecast (30 years) as part of their "CBO Long-Term Budget Outlook" annual report. Over the longer-term, the U.S. faces budgetary challenges primarily related to an aging population, along with healthcare costs growing faster than inflation, which are increasing the spending relative to GDP for mandatory programs such as Social Security and Medicare. Under current law, future deficits driven primarily by these programs are expected to drive larger amounts of debt and interest payments, particularly as interest rates return to more normal levels from the unusually low levels during the aftermath of the Great Recession. For example, Social Security spending relative to GDP is expected to rise from 4.9% GDP in 2016 to 6.2% GDP by over the 2027–2036 period; for Medicare, these figures are 3.8% GDP and 5.5% GDP, respectively. Without changes that increase revenues or reduce the rate of spending increases relative to GDP or both, U.S. debt held by the public will rise beyond the 100% GDP level by 2030, a level last seen in the aftermath of World War 2.

Cause of increases in deficits and debt 2001–2011

CBO cause of change analysis
Both economic conditions and policy decisions significantly worsened the debt outlook since 2001, when large budget surpluses were forecast for the following decade by the Congressional Budget Office (CBO). In June 2012, CBO summarized the cause of change between its January 2001 estimate of a $5.6 trillion cumulative surplus between 2002 and 2011 and the actual $6.1 trillion cumulative deficit that occurred, an unfavorable "turnaround" or debt increase of $11.7 trillion. Tax cuts and slower-than-expected growth reduced revenues by $6.1 trillion and spending was $5.6 trillion higher. Of this total, the CBO attributes 72% to legislated tax cuts and spending increases and 27% to economic and technical factors. Of the latter, 56% occurred from 2009 to 2011.

According to CBO, the difference between the projected and actual debt in 2011 can be largely attributed to:
 $3.5 trillion – Economic changes (including lower than expected tax revenues and higher safety net spending due to recession)
 $1.6 trillion – Bush Tax Cuts (EGTRRA and JGTRRA), primarily tax cuts but also some smaller spending increases
 $1.5 trillion – Increased defense and non-defense discretionary spending
 $1.4 trillion – Wars in Afghanistan and Iraq
 $1.4 trillion – Incremental interest due to higher debt balances
 $0.9 trillion – Obama stimulus and tax cuts (ARRA and Tax Act of 2010)

Similar analyses were reported by the Pew Center in November 2011, The New York Times in June 2009, The Washington Post in April 2011 and the Center on Budget and Policy Priorities in May 2011.

Economist Paul Krugman wrote in May 2011: "What happened to the budget surplus the federal government had in 2000? The answer is, three main things. First, there were the Bush tax cuts, which added roughly $2 trillion to the national debt over the last decade. Second, there were the wars in Iraq and Afghanistan, which added an additional $1.1 trillion or so. And third was the Great Recession, which led both to a collapse in revenue and to a sharp rise in spending on unemployment insurance and other safety-net programs." A Bloomberg analysis in May 2011 attributed $2.0 trillion of the $9.3 trillion of public debt (20%) to additional military and intelligence spending since September 2001, plus another $45 billion annually in interest.

What deficit trajectory did President Obama "inherit"?

The Republicans were quick to blame President Obama for the large debt increases during his tenure. But was he really to blame? The Great Recession had caused federal government revenues to fall to their lowest level relative to the size of the economy in 50 years, with tax revenues falling nearly $400 billion (20%) from 2008 to 2009. At the same time, safety net expenditures (including automatic stabilizers such as unemployment compensation, food stamps, and disability payments) caused expenditures to rise considerably. For example, automatic stabilizer spending (which took effect without legislative action; benefits are paid to eligible recipients) ranged between $350–420 billion annually from 2009–2012, roughly 10% of the expenditures. This drove the budget deficit up even without any policy steps by President Obama, creating significant debt concerns. This resulted in a series of bruising debates with the Republican Congress, which attempted (with much success) to blame the President for the deficits caused primarily by the recession that began during the Bush administration.

One incident illustrates the nature and tensions of the debate. The U.S. added $1.0 trillion to the national debt in fiscal year (FY) 2008, which ended September 2008. The Congressional Budget Office projected two weeks prior to Obama taking office in January 2009 that the deficit in FY2009 would be $1.2 trillion and that the debt increase over the following decade would be $3.1 trillion assuming the expiration of the Bush tax cuts as scheduled in 2010, or around $6.0 trillion if the Bush tax cuts were extended at all income levels. Adjusting other assumptions in the CBO baseline could have raised that debt level even higher. In response to Republican criticism, President Obama claimed that "The fact of the matter is that when we came into office, the deficit was $1.3 trillion [for FY 2009]...[with] $8 trillion worth of debt [projected] over the next decade," a claim which Politifact rated as "Mostly True." President Obama had pledged not to raise taxes except on high income taxpayers, so his debt figure included the extension of the Bush tax cuts for most taxpayers. These facts did not stop Republicans from blaming the President for the ensuing debts during his administration.

One study summarized in The New York Times estimated that President Bush's policies added $5.07 trillion to the debt between 2002–2009, while President Obama's policies would add an estimated $1.44 trillion to the debt between 2009–2017.

The CBO forecasts the annual budget surplus or deficit amounts for the next ten years in their annual "Budget and Economic Outlook." Using the forecast from the month of each President's inauguration allows an evaluation of their budgetary performance using laws in place prior to their tenure, against actual results in the CBO historical tables:
 In January 2001, CBO forecast that the sum of the annual budget surplus or deficits from 2001–2008 (the G.W. Bush era) would be a $3.7 trillion surplus, using laws in place at the end of the Bill Clinton administration. However, the actual deficits totaled $1.8 trillion, a turn for the worse of $5.5 trillion. As discussed above, this was due to the Bush tax cuts, two wars, and two recessions not in the CBO 2001 forecast.
 In January 2009, CBO forecast that the sum of the annual budget deficits from 2009–2016 (the Barack Obama era) would be a $3.7 trillion deficit, based on laws in place at the end of the G.W. Bush administration. This forecast assumed the Bush tax cuts would expire in 2010. However, the actual deficits totaled $7.3 trillion, a $3.6 trillion turn for the worse. This was due to the Great Recession being worse than anticipated, stimulus programs, and the extension of most of the Bush tax cuts relative to the CBO forecast.

The "fiscal cliff"

A major debate during the latter half of 2012 was whether or not to allow a series of scheduled tax cut expirations and spending cuts to take effect. The impact of these changes was referred to as the "fiscal cliff." The CBO estimated in May 2012 that without legislative changes this would:
 Reduce the projected 2013 deficit from $1,037 billion to $641 billion, a 38% reduction;
 Reduce real GDP growth in 2013 from 1.7% to -0.5%, with a high probability of recession during the first half of the year, followed by 2.3% growth in the second half;
 Increase the unemployment rate from 8.0% to 9.1%; and
 Support relatively higher growth over the long-run, due to lower deficits and debt.

The CBO estimated that letting existing laws take effect beyond 2012 would significantly reduce future budget deficits. For example, the Bush tax cuts of 2001 and 2003 (initially extended by Obama from 2010 to 2012) were scheduled to expire at the end of 2012. Other deficit reducers per the CBO included: allowing the automatic spending cuts in the Budget Control Act of 2011 to take effect, allowing payroll tax cuts in 2011 and 2012 to expire, allowing the alternative minimum tax (AMT) to affect more taxpayers, and reducing Medicare reimbursements to doctors. These and other current laws, if allowed to take effect, were expected to reduce the projected 2021 deficit from an estimated 4.7% GDP to 1.2% GDP. Total deficit reduction could be as high as $7.1 trillion over a decade if current law was enforced and not overridden by new legislation.

The now infamous phrase was coined by Federal Reserve Chairman Ben Bernanke in February 2012, during one of his required appearances before Congress on the state of the U.S. economy. He described ... "a massive fiscal cliff of large spending cuts and tax increases" on Jan. 1, 2013.

The fiscal cliff was mostly avoided by the American Taxpayer Relief Act of 2012, which included: a) the expiration of the Bush tax cuts for only the top 1% of income earners; b) the end of the Obama payroll tax cuts; and c) a sequester (cap) on spending for the military and other discretionary categories of spending. Compared against a baseline where the Bush tax cuts were allowed to expire for all levels of income, it significantly increased future deficits. Compared against the prior year, it significantly reduced the deficit and avoided some future cost increases.

Budgetary impact of the Affordable Care Act ("Obamacare")

The Affordable Care Act (ACA) was evaluated multiple times by the Congressional Budget Office, which scored it as a moderate deficit reducer, as it included tax hikes primarily on high income taxpayers (over $200,000, roughly the top 5% of earners) and reductions in future Medicare cost increases, offsetting subsidy costs. The CBO also reported in June 2015 that: "Including the budgetary effects of macroeconomic feedback, repealing the ACA would increase federal budget deficits by $137 billion over the 2016–2025 period." CBO also estimated that excluding the effects of macroeconomic feedback, repeal of the ACA would increase the deficit by $353 billion over that same period.

Economic impact on the budget deficit

Linkage of economy and budget
A booming economy tends to improve the budget deficit, as high levels of activity and employment generate higher tax revenues, while safety net expenditures (e.g., automatic stabilizers such as unemployment, food stamps, and disability) are reduced. Further, since GDP is higher, budgetary measures relative to GDP are lower. On the other hand, a slumping economy (recession) works in the opposite direction, as lower economic activity and higher unemployment reduce tax revenues, and higher automatic stabilizer spending occurs. The effects of the Great Recession were discussed in the background section. So a key to understanding the connection between the economy and the budget is employment. This is one reason why politicians focus on job creation as a primary responsibility.

John Maynard Keynes wrote in 1937: "The boom, not the slump, is the right time for austerity at the Treasury." In other words, the government should act to stabilize economic conditions, reducing the budget deficit when the economy is booming (or maintaining a surplus) and increasing the deficit (or reducing the surplus) when the economy is in recession. The only fiscal years since 1970 when the U.S. had a budget surplus were 1998–2001, a combination of the booming 1990's economy and Clinton's higher tax rates. Economic stimulus (increasing the deficit) is done by lowering taxes or increasing spending, while the opposite is done for economic austerity.

Economist Laura D'Andrea Tyson wrote in July 2011: "Like many economists, I believe that the immediate crisis facing the United States economy is the jobs deficit, not the budget deficit. The magnitude of the jobs crisis is clearly illustrated by the jobs gap – currently around 12.3 million jobs. That is how many jobs the economy must add to return to its peak employment level before the 2008–9 recession and to absorb the 125,000 people who enter the labor force each month. At the current pace of recovery, the gap will be not closed until 2020 or later." She explained further that job growth between 2000 and 2007 was only half what it had been in the preceding three decades, pointing to several studies by other economists indicating globalization and technology change had highly negative effects on certain sectors of the U.S. workforce and overall wage levels.

Government budget balance as a sectoral component

Economist Martin Wolf explained in July 2012 that government fiscal balance is one of three major financial sectoral balances in the U.S. economy, the others being the foreign financial sector and the private financial sector. The sum of the surpluses or deficits across these three sectors must be zero by definition. In the U.S., a foreign financial surplus (or capital surplus) exists because capital is imported (net) to fund the trade deficit. Further, there is a private sector financial surplus due to household savings exceeding business investment. By definition, there must therefore exist a government budget deficit so all three net to zero. The government sector includes federal, state and local. For example, the government budget deficit in 2011 was approximately 10% GDP (8.6% GDP of which was federal), offsetting a capital surplus of 4% GDP and a private sector surplus of 6% GDP.

Wolf argued that the sudden shift in the private sector from deficit to surplus forced the government balance into deficit, writing: "The financial balance of the private sector shifted towards surplus by the almost unbelievable cumulative total of 11.2 per cent of gross domestic product between the third quarter of 2007 and the second quarter of 2009, which was when the financial deficit of US government (federal and state) reached its peak ... No fiscal policy changes explain the collapse into massive fiscal deficit between 2007 and 2009, because there was none of any importance. The collapse is explained by the massive shift of the private sector from financial deficit into surplus or, in other words, from boom to bust."

Economist Paul Krugman also explained in December 2011 the causes of the sizable shift from private deficit to surplus: "This huge move into surplus reflects the end of the housing bubble, a sharp rise in household saving, and a slump in business investment due to lack of customers."

Which party runs larger budget deficits?

Economists Alan Blinder and Mark Watson reported that budget deficits tended to be smaller under Democratic presidents, at 2.1% potential GDP versus 2.8% potential GDP for Republican presidents, a difference of about 0.7% GDP. Their study was from President Truman through President Obama's first term, which ended in January 2013.

President Trump's proposals

Prior to his election, President Donald Trump proposed policies including significant income tax cuts and increased spending on defense and infrastructure. The Committee for a Responsible Federal Budget (CRFB) and Moody's Analytics reported in 2016 that enacting these policies would dramatically increase the annual budget deficits and national debt over the 2017-2026 periods, relative to the current policy baseline, which already includes a sizable debt increase.

For example, the CRFB estimated that:
 Revenues would fall $5.8 trillion over 10 years relative to the current policy baseline, due to significant income tax cuts. Roughly 50% of federal income taxes are paid by the top 1% highest income taxpayers; those with lower incomes pay payroll taxes. So this type of tax cut primarily benefits the wealthy.
 Spending would be reduced by $1.2 trillion over 10 years, offset by $700 billion in additional interest expense, for a net reduction of $0.5 trillion.
 The deficit would increase by $5.3 trillion over 10 years.
 Debt held by the public would rise to 105% GDP by 2026, versus 86% GDP under the current policy baseline. It was approximately 76% in 2016.

The CBO will "score" any major budgetary legislation proposed by Trump during his tenure.

What deficit trajectory did President Trump "inherit"?
In January 2017, the Congressional Budget Office reported its baseline budget projections for the 2017–2027 time periods, based on laws in place as of the end of the Obama administration. CBO forecasted that the sum of the annual budget deficits (i.e., debt additions) would be $9.4 trillion from 2018-2027. These increases would primarily be driven by an aging population, which impacts the costs of Social Security and Medicare, along with interest on the debt.

CBO also estimated that if policies in place as of the end of the Obama administration continued over the following decade, real GDP would grow at approximately 2% per year, the unemployment rate would remain around 5%, inflation would remain around 2%, and interest rates would rise moderately. President Trump's economic policies can also be measured against this baseline.

How have President Trump's policies impacted the federal budget?
Deficits can be analyzed by comparing actual figures across years, or actual figures vs. CBO baseline forecasts before and after major legislation is passed, to evaluate the effect of that legislation. Fiscal year 2018 (FY 2018) ran from October 1, 2017 through September 30, 2018. It was the first fiscal year budgeted by President Trump. The Treasury department reported on October 15, 2018 that the budget deficit rose from $666 billion in FY2017 to $779 billion in FY2018, an increase of $113 billion or 17.0%. Tax receipts increased 0.4%, while outlays increased 3.2%. Tax revenues typically rise in a growing economy; they grow more slowly under a CBO baseline with the tax cuts than without. The 2018 deficit was an estimated 3.9% of GDP, up from 3.5% GDP in 2017.

During January 2017, just prior to President Trump's inauguration, CBO forecast that the FY 2018 budget deficit would be $487 billion if laws in place at that time remained in place. The $782 billion actual result represents a $295 billion or 61% increase versus that forecast. This difference was mainly due to the Tax Cuts and Jobs Act, which took effect in 2018, and other spending legislation.

For the 2018-2027 period, CBO forecast in January 2017 that continuing Obama policies would add $9.4 trillion to the debt (i.e., sum of annual deficits for those years). However, the April 2018 CBO forecast was increased to $13.7 trillion following the Tax Cuts and Jobs Act and other spending legislation, an increase of $4.3 trillion or 46%. This "current policy" forecast assumes the Trump tax cuts for individuals would be extended beyond their scheduled expiration date.

The New York Times reported in August 2019 that: "The increasing levels of red ink stem from a steep falloff in federal revenue after Mr. Trump’s 2017 tax cuts, which lowered individual and corporate tax rates, resulting in far fewer tax dollars flowing to the Treasury Department. Tax revenues for 2018 and 2019 have fallen more than $430 billion short of what the budget office predicted they would be in June 2017, before the tax law was approved that December."

Debates about the public debt

What is the appropriate measure of public debt?
Economists also debate the definition of public debt and the right measures to use in determining the debt burden carried by a country and its citizens. Common measures include:
 Debt held by the public: Obligations of government to holders of marketable government securities, such as Treasury bonds.
 Intra-governmental debt: Obligations of government to particular legal entities, such as the Social Security Trust Fund.
 Gross or national debt: The sum of debt held by the public plus the intra-governmental debt.

Both the debt held by the public in dollars and as ratio relative to the size of the economy (GDP) are common measures. The CBO reports these amounts since fiscal year 1967 in the "Historical Budget Data" accompanying their "Budget and Economic Outlook" report, published annually in January.
 Debt held by the public grew in dollars an average of 12% per year from 2008 through 2016, rising from $5.8 trillion in 2008 to $14.2 trillion in 2016.
 Debt held by the public rose rapidly from 39.3% in 2008 to 70.4% by 2012, then slowly grew to 77.0% by 2016.

The Treasury Department provides data on the national debt at points in time through its TreasuryDirect website and U.S. Treasury Fiscal Data website. It publishes a monthly "Debt position and activity report" which includes the debt held by the public, the intra-governmental debt, and national debt ("Total public debt outstanding"). As of December 31, 2016, these amounts were:
 Debt held by the public: $14.43 trillion.
 Intra-governmental debt: $5.54 trillion.
 National debt: $19.97 trillion.
 Relative to a nominal GDP figure of $18.9 trillion for Q4 2016, national debt was approximately 106% GDP.

Paul Krugman argued in May 2010 that the debt held by the public is the right measure to use, while Reinhart testified to the National Commission on Fiscal Responsibility and Reform that gross debt is the appropriate measure. Certain members of the Commission are focusing on gross debt. The Center on Budget and Policy Priorities (CBPP) cited research by several economists supporting the use of the lower debt held by the public figure as a more accurate measure of the debt burden, disagreeing with these Commission members.

Intragovernmental debt
There is debate regarding the economic nature of the intragovernmental debt, which was approximately $4.6 trillion in February 2011. A significant portion of the intragovernmental debt is the $2.6 trillion Social Security Trust Fund.

For example, the CBPP argues:

Debt held by the public is important because it reflects the extent to which the government goes into private credit markets to borrow. Such borrowing draws on private national saving and international saving, and therefore competes with investment in the nongovernmental sector (for factories and equipment, research and development, housing, and so forth). Large increases in such borrowing can also push up interest rates and increase the amount of future interest payments the federal government must make to lenders outside of the United States, which reduces Americans' income. By contrast, intragovernmental debt (the other component of the gross debt) has no such effects because it is simply money the federal government owes (and pays interest on) to itself.

If the U.S. continues to run "on budget" deficits as projected by the CBO and OMB for the foreseeable future, it will have to issue marketable Treasury bills and bonds (i.e., debt held by the public) to pay for the projected shortfall in the Social Security program. This will result in "debt held by the public" replacing "intragovernmental debt" to the extent of the Social Security Trust Fund during the period the Trust Fund is liquidated, which is expected to occur between 2015 and the mid-2030s. This replacement of intragovernmental debt with debt held by the public would not occur if: a) The U.S. runs on-budget surpluses sufficient to offset "off-budget" deficits in the Social Security program; or b) Social Security is reformed to maintain an off-budget surplus.

Is there a "danger level" of debt?
Work by economists Carmen Reinhart and Kenneth Rogoff reported in 2010 was used to imply that a debt level of 90% of GDP was a dangerous threshold, a conclusion that had been particularly influential among those advocating austerity and tighter budgets. However, the threshold was criticized due to a coding error and questionable methodology.

Economist Paul Krugman disputes the existence of a solid debt threshold or danger level, arguing that low growth causes high debt rather than the other way around. He also points out that in Europe, Japan, and the US this has been the case. In the US the only period of debt over 90% of GDP was after World War II "when real GDP was falling."

Fed Chair Ben Bernanke stated in April 2010:

Neither experience nor economic theory clearly indicates the threshold at which government debt begins to endanger prosperity and economic stability. But given the significant costs and risks associated with a rapidly rising federal debt, our nation should soon put in place a credible plan for reducing deficits to sustainable levels over time.

Debates about tax policy
Democrats and Republicans mean very different things when they talk about tax reform. Democrats argue for the wealthy to pay more via higher income tax rates, while Republicans focus on lowering income tax rates. While both parties discuss reducing tax expenditures (i.e., exemptions and deductions), Republicans focus on preserving lower tax rates for capital gains and dividends, while Democrats prefer educational credits and capping deductions. Political realities make it unlikely that more than $150 billion per year in individual tax expenditures could be eliminated. One area with more common ground is corporate tax rates, where both parties have generally agreed that lower rates and fewer tax expenditures would align the U.S. more directly with foreign competition.

How much tax revenue could be raised by taxing the rich more?
There is a significant amount of revenue that could be raised by increasing income and wealth taxes on the richest (e.g., top 1%) of Americans, who earned roughly $600,000 or more in 2017: 
The Washington Post reported on separate studies by two economists that concluded increasing the top marginal tax rate for the top 1% of income earners from the 2018 37% rate to a 70% rate could increase revenue by up to $3 trillion over 10 years in total. This estimate may be high because the wealthy might find methods of evading some of these increased taxes (e.g., shifting more wealth to tax-free municipal bonds). Increasing the rate to 57% instead could raise $1.7 trillion over a decade in total, while increasing it to 83% could raise $3.8 trillion over a decade in total.
The CBO estimated raising taxes on the two highest income tax brackets by just 1 percentage point (e.g., from 37% to 38%) would net about $120 billion over 10 years. This would apply to everyone who earns more than $200,000 annually.
The CBO estimated that a 0.1% financial transactions tax rate would raise $780 billion over 10 years in total.
The CBO estimated that returning the corporate tax rate to 35% (it was lowered to 21% in 2018 due to the Tax Cuts and Jobs Act) could raise an additional $1 trillion total over 10 years.
The CBO estimated that for the 2014-2023 period there would be nearly $12 trillion total in tax expenditures (e.g., deductions, exclusions, and preferential rates), approximately 17% of which ($2 trillion or $200 billion/year on average) would apply to just the top 1% of income earners. One of the largest tax expenditure for this group (roughly half) is the preferential (lower) rate charged for capital gains and dividends.

In 2018, economist Paul Krugman summarized studies by other economists that concluded the optimal marginal tax rate would be in the 73% or higher range, in terms of revenue maximization. This is due to a combination of factors, including the rich tend to save more of each marginal dollar rather than spend it; taxing away some of this money and transferring it to lower income persons who spend it boosts economic growth and income.

Budgetary impact of the 2001 and 2003 tax cuts

A variety of tax cuts were enacted under President Bush between 2001–2003 (commonly referred to as the "Bush tax cuts"), through the Economic Growth and Tax Relief Reconciliation Act of 2001 (EGTRRA) and the Jobs and Growth Tax Relief Reconciliation Act of 2003 (JGTRRA). Most of these tax cuts were scheduled to expire December 31, 2010. They were extended until 2013 by the Tax Relief, Unemployment Insurance Reauthorization, and Job Creation Act of 2010 and then allowed to expire for approximately the top 1% of taxpayers only as part of the American Taxpayer Relief Act of 2012.

So what were the budgetary implications of the Bush tax cuts?
 The Congressional Budget Office (CBO) projected two weeks prior to Obama taking office in January 2009 that the deficit in FY2009 would be $1.2 trillion and that the debt increase over the following decade would be $3.1 trillion assuming the expiration of the Bush tax cuts as scheduled in 2010, or around $6.0 trillion if the Bush tax cuts were extended at all income levels. Adjusting other assumptions in the CBO baseline could have raised that debt level even higher. So by this estimate, these tax cuts represented about $3 trillion in less revenue and more interest (i.e., more debt) over a decade.
 In August 2010, CBO estimated that extending the tax cuts for the 2011–2020 time period would add $3.3 trillion to the national debt: $2.65 trillion in foregone tax revenue plus another $0.66 trillion for interest and debt service costs.

The non-partisan Pew Charitable Trusts estimated in May 2010 that extending some or all of the Bush tax cuts would have the following impact under these scenarios:
 Making the tax cuts permanent for all taxpayers, regardless of income, would increase the national debt $3.1 trillion over the next 10 years.
 Limiting the extension to individuals making less than $200,000 and married couples earning less than $250,000 would increase the debt about $2.3 trillion in the next decade.
 Extending the tax cuts for all taxpayers for only two years would cost $558 billion over the next 10 years.

The non-partisan Congressional Research Service (CRS) has reported the 10-year revenue loss from extending the 2001 and 2003 tax cuts beyond 2010 at $2.9 trillion, with an additional $606 billion in debt service costs (interest), for a combined total of $3.5 trillion. CRS cited CBO estimates that extending the cuts permanently, including the repeal of the estate tax, would add 2% of GDP to the annual deficit. For scale, the historical average deficit as % GDP was approximately 2.8% from 1966 to 2015, so this represented a nearly doubling of the deficit.

The Center on Budget and Policy Priorities wrote in 2010: "The 75-year Social Security shortfall is about the same size as the cost, over that period, of extending the 2001 and 2003 tax cuts for the richest 2 percent of Americans (those with incomes above $250,000 a year). Members of Congress cannot simultaneously claim that the tax cuts for people at the top are affordable while the Social Security shortfall constitutes a dire fiscal threat."

Can reducing income tax rates increase government revenue?

CBO, CRS and Treasury Department studies
The Congressional Budget Office has consistently reported that tax cuts do not pay for themselves; they increase the deficit relative to a policy baseline without the tax cut. For example, CBO estimated in June 2012 that the Bush tax cuts of 2001 and 2003 (EGTRRA and JGTRRA) added about $1.6 trillion to the debt between 2001 and 2011, excluding interest. In August 2010, the Congressional Budget Office (CBO) estimated that extending the tax cuts for the 2011-2020 time period would add $3.3 trillion to the national debt, comprising $2.65 trillion in foregone tax revenue plus another $0.66 trillion for interest and debt service costs.

A 2006 Treasury Department study estimated that the Bush tax cuts reduced revenue by approximately 1.5% GDP on average for each of the first four years after their implementation, an approximately 6% annual reduction in revenue relative to a baseline without those tax cuts. The study also indicated the Kennedy tax cuts of 1962 and Reagan tax cuts of 1981 reduced revenue. The study did not extend the analysis beyond the first four years of implementation.

The non-partisan Congressional Research Service reported in 2012 that:
"The reduction in the top tax rates appears to be uncorrelated with saving, investment and productivity growth. The top tax rates appear to have little or no relation to the size of the economic pie. However, the top tax rate reductions appear to be associated with the increasing concentration of income at the top of the income distribution."

Supply side arguments
In theory, the government collects no revenue at either zero or 100% tax rates. So there is some intermediate point at which government revenue is maximized. Lowering tax rates from 100% to this hypothetical rate that maximizes revenue would theoretically raise revenue, while continuing to lower tax rates below this rate would lower revenues. This concept underlies the Laffer Curve, an element of supply-side economics. Since the 1970s, some "supply side" economists have contended that lowering marginal tax rates could stimulate economic growth to such a degree that tax revenues could rise, other factors being held constant.

However, economic models and econometric analysis have found weak support for the "supply side" theory. The Treasury Department reported in 2006 that tax cuts in 1962, 1981, 2001, and 2003 all reduced revenue relative to a policy baseline without those tax cuts. The Center on Budget and Policy Priorities (CBPP) summarized a variety of studies done by economists across the political spectrum that indicated tax cuts do not pay for themselves and increase deficits. Studies by the CBO and the U.S. Treasury also indicated that tax cuts do not pay for themselves.

In 2003, 450 economists, including ten Nobel Prize laureate, signed the Economists' statement opposing the Bush tax cuts, sent to President Bush stating that "these tax cuts will worsen the long-term budget outlook... will reduce the capacity of the government to finance Social Security and Medicare benefits as well as investments in schools, health, infrastructure, and basic research... [and] generate further inequalities in after-tax income."

Economist Paul Krugman wrote in 2007: "Supply side doctrine, which claimed without evidence that tax cuts would pay for themselves, never got any traction in the world of professional economic research, even among conservatives." The Washington Post summarized a variety of tax studies in 2007 done by both liberal and conservative economists, indicating that both income and capital gains tax cuts do not pay for themselves. Economist Nouriel Roubini wrote in October 2010 that the Republican Party was "trapped in a belief in voodoo economics, the economic equivalent of creationism" while the Democratic administration was unwilling to improve the tax system via a carbon tax or value-added tax. Warren Buffett wrote in 2003: "When you listen to tax-cut rhetoric, remember that giving one class of taxpayer a 'break' requires – now or down the line – that an equivalent burden be imposed on other parties. In other words, if I get a break, someone else pays. Government can't deliver a free lunch to the country as a whole." Former Comptroller General of the United States David Walker stated during January 2009: "You can't have guns, butter and tax cuts. The numbers just don't add up." Economist Simon Johnson wrote in April 2012: "The idea that reducing taxes 'pays for itself' through higher growth is just wishful thinking."

Empirical observations
Income tax revenues generally rose to new peaks in nominal dollar terms each year from 1970 to 2000 as the economy grew, with the exception of 1983, following the recession of 1981-1982. However, after peaking in 2000, income tax revenues did not regain this peak again until 2006. After a plateau in 2007 and 2008, revenues fell markedly in 2009 and 2010 due to a financial crisis and recession. Income tax revenues in 2010 remained below their 2000 peak. Relative to GDP, income tax revenues declined during most of the 1980s (from 9.0% GDP in 1980 to 8.3% GDP in 1989), rose during most of the 1990s (from 8.1% GDP in 1990 to 9.6% GDP in 1999) then declined in the 2000s (from 10.2% GDP in 2000 to 6.5% GDP in 2009). The extent to which economic activity and tax policy interact to drive these trends is debated by experts. While marginal income tax rates were lowered in the early 1980s, dollar revenue increased throughout the period, although revenue relative to GDP declined. Marginal tax rates were raised during the 1990s, and both revenue dollars and revenue relative to GDP increased. Marginal rates were lowered again in the early 2000s, and both revenue and revenue relative to GDP generally declined.

Can increasing tax receipts alone address the budget deficit?

Expert panels across the political spectrum have argued for a combination of revenue increases and expense reductions to reduce the budget deficit and future debt increases. However, the nature and balance of these measures varies considerably. Economist Bruce Bartlett wrote in 2009 that without benefit cuts in Medicare and Social Security, federal taxes would have to increase by 8.1% of GDP now and forever to cover estimated program shortfalls, while avoiding debt increases. The 30-year historical average federal tax receipts are 18.4% of GDP, so this would represent a substantial increase in tax receipts as a share of GDP relative to historical levels in the United States. However, such an increase would still leave tax revenues relative to GDP substantially lower than other developed nations like France and Germany (see: List of countries by tax revenue as percentage of GDP).

CBO estimated in August 2011 that if the Bush tax cuts and other tax cuts enacted or extended during 2009 and 2010 were allowed to expire, the budget deficit would be reduced by 2.0-3.0% GDP each year from 2013-2021.

Do tax hikes "kill jobs"?
Prominent Republican Congressmen argued during President Obama's tenure that raising taxes would "kill" jobs. This was a common Republican talking point heard often from 2011-2013, as debates around the United States fiscal cliff and the expiration of the Bush tax cuts continued. But is it true? What about in the short-run versus the long-run?
 Short-run: Economic theory indicates that raising taxes such that the budget deficit is reduced slows the economy in the short-run, other things equal. In other words, a higher budget deficit is consistent with more economic stimulus and job creation, while a lower budget deficit means less economic stimulus and job creation. For example, the CBO forecast the economic results for 2013 under low- and high-deficit scenarios related to the United States fiscal cliff. Under the lower deficit scenario, economic growth was slower and the unemployment rate higher in 2013. This assumed the expiration of the Bush tax cuts at all income levels for 2013, as well as the payroll tax cuts enacted by President Obama. This would appear to support the Republican talking point, at least in the short-run.
 Long-run: CBO also reported that higher debt levels due to extending the tax cuts could hurt economic growth and employment in the long-run: "Moreover, if the fiscal tightening was removed [tax cuts extended] and the policies that are currently in effect were kept in place indefinitely, a continued surge in federal debt during the rest of this decade and beyond would raise the risk of a fiscal crisis (in which the government would lose the ability to borrow money at affordable interest rates) and would eventually reduce the nation's output [and therefore employment] and income below what would occur if the fiscal tightening was allowed to take place as currently set by law."

So in summary, economic theory indicates tax hikes may slow job creation in the short-run, but boost it in the long-run through lower debt levels.

However, this "other things equal" condition is rarely met in the real world, where many economic factors are moving simultaneously. For example, economic growth and job creation was higher during the Clinton administration (which raised income taxes) than under Reagan's (which cut income taxes). Likewise, the rate of job creation was greater under the Obama administration (which raised income taxes) than during the G. W. Bush administration (which cut income taxes). In other words, historical evidence indicates income tax hikes were consistent with periods of higher job growth in the short-run, despite the prevailing economic theory, as the "other things equal" condition may not have been met.

Can the U.S. outgrow the problem?

There is debate regarding whether tax cuts, less intrusive regulation, and productivity improvements could feasibly generate sufficient economic growth to offset the deficit and debt challenges facing the country. According to David Stockman, OMB Director under President Reagan, post-1980 Republican ideology embraces the idea that the "economy will outgrow the deficit if plied with enough tax cuts." Former President George W. Bush exemplified this ideology when he wrote in 2007: "...it is also a fact that our tax cuts have fueled robust economic growth and record revenues."

However, multiple studies by economists across the political spectrum and several government organizations argue that tax cuts increase deficits and debt.

The GAO estimated in 2008 that double-digit GDP growth would be required for the following 75 years to outgrow the projected increases in deficits and debt; GDP growth averaged 3.2% during the 1990s. Because mandatory spending growth rates will far exceed any reasonable growth rate in GDP and the tax base, the GAO concluded that the U.S. cannot grow its way out of the problem.

Fed Chair Ben Bernanke stated in April 2010: "Unfortunately, we cannot grow our way out of this problem. No credible forecast suggests that future rates of growth of the U.S. economy will be sufficient to close these deficits without significant changes to our fiscal policies."

Income taxes

The historical record indicates that marginal income tax rate changes have little impact on job creation or employment.
 During the 1970s, marginal income tax rates were far higher than subsequent periods and the U.S. created 20.6 million net new jobs.
 During the 1980s, marginal income tax rates were lowered and the U.S. created 19.5 million net new jobs.
 During the 1990s, marginal income tax rates rose and the U.S. created 18.1 million net new jobs.
 From 2000-2010, marginal income tax rates were lowered and the U.S. created only 2.2 million net new jobs, with 9.2 million created 2000-2007.

The Center on Budget and Policy Priorities (CBPP) wrote in March 2009: "Small business employment rose by an average of 2.3 percent (756,000 jobs) per year during the Clinton years, when tax rates for high-income filers were set at very similar levels to those that would be reinstated under President Obama's budget. But during the Bush years, when the rates were lower, employment rose by just 1.0 percent (367,000 jobs)." CBPP reported in September 2011 that both employment and GDP grew faster in the seven-year period following President Clinton's income tax rate increase of 1993, than a similar period after the Bush tax cuts of 2001.

In addition, Warren Buffett has argued that taxes have little to do with job creation, writing in August 2011: "And to those who argue that higher rates hurt job creation, I would note that a net of nearly 40 million jobs were added between 1980 and 2000. You know what's happened since then: lower tax rates and far lower job creation." From 2002 to 2011, the nine US states with the highest income taxes grew their economy 8.2%, all states with an income tax grew 6.3%, and the nine states without an income tax grew 5.2%.

A more specific, frequently debated, proposal supported by prominent Democrats is to significantly increase the taxes of the top 1 percent of income earners to generate additional revenue. According to the Tax Foundation, the so-called "super-rich" accumulated more than 20 percent of the nation's total adjusted gross income in 2008 and paid 36 percent of the total income tax. Republican opponents fear that any type of large tax hike, even to the wealthy, would decrease both job creation and investment, slowing the economy even further. In an op-ed in The New York Times in August 2011, Buffett wrote in support of such a tax hike on the richest Americans, stating that the federal government should "stop coddling the super-rich" to help decrease the deficit. In response, conservative commentator Pat Buchanan challenged Buffett, and any other rich people who wanted higher taxes, to voluntarily donate the money to the IRS instead.

Corporate taxes

A number of US corporations claim that even the current 35 percent corporate income tax rate causes them to shift several of their operations, including their research and manufacturing facilities, overseas.

For example, Steven Ballmer, Microsoft's chief executive officer, stated in 2009 that higher taxes "...makes U.S. jobs more expensive. [Microsoft is] better off taking lots of people and moving them out of the U.S. as opposed to keeping them inside the U.S." Microsoft reported an overall effective tax rate of 26 percent in its 2008 annual report: "Our effective tax rates are less than the statutory tax rate due to foreign earnings taxed at lower rates" the report said. U.S. tax rules let companies defer paying corporate rates as high as 35 percent on most types of foreign profits as long as that money remains invested overseas. President Obama says he wants to end such incentives to keep foreign profits tax-deferred so that companies would invest them in the U.S.

In comparing corporate taxes, the Congressional Budget Office found in 2005 that the top statutory tax rate was the third highest among OECD countries behind Japan and Germany. However, the U.S. ranked 27th lowest of 30 OECD countries in its collection of corporate taxes relative to GDP, at 1.8% vs. the average 2.5%.

U.S. corporate after-tax profits were at record levels during the third quarter of 2012, at an annualized $1.75 trillion. U.S. federal corporate income tax revenues have declined relative to profits, falling from approximately 27% in 2000 to 17% in 2012.

U.S. taxes relative to foreign countries

Comparison of tax rates around the world is difficult and somewhat subjective. Tax laws in most countries are extremely complex, and tax burden falls differently on different groups in each country and sub-national units (states, counties and municipalities) and the types of services rendered through those taxes are also different.

One way to measure the overall tax burden is by looking at it as a percentage of the overall economy in terms of GDP. The Tax Policy Center wrote: "U.S. taxes are low relative to those in other developed countries. In 2006 U.S. taxes at all levels of government claimed 28 percent of GDP, compared with an average of 36 percent of GDP for the 30 member countries of the Organization for Economic Co-operation and Development (OECD)." Economist Simon Johnson wrote in 2010: "The U.S. government doesn't take in much tax revenue – at least 10 percentage points of GDP less than comparable developed economies – and it also doesn't spend much except on the military, Social Security and Medicare." A comparison of taxation on individuals amongst OECD countries shows that the U.S. tax burden is just slightly below the average tax for middle income earners.

 Deficit spending can distort the true total effective taxation. One way to mitigate this distortion is to evaluate spending levels. This approach shows the level of services a country is willing to accept versus what they are willing to pay. In 2010, the Federal government of the US spent an average of $11,041 per citizen (per capita). This compares to the 2010 World average spending of $2376 per citizen and an average of $16,110 per citizen for the World's 20 largest economies (in terms of GDP). Of the 20 largest economies, only six spent less per citizen: South Korea ($4557), Brazil ($2813), Russia ($2458), China ($1010), and India ($226). Of the 13 that spent more, Norway and Sweden top the list with per citizen spending of $40908 and $26760 respectively.

In comparing corporate taxes, the Congressional Budget Office found in 2005 that the top statutory tax rate was the third highest among OECD countries behind Japan and Germany. However, the U.S. ranked 27th lowest of 30 OECD countries in its collection of corporate taxes relative to GDP, at 1.8% vs. the average 2.5%. Bruce Bartlett wrote in May 2011: "...one almost never hears that total revenues are at their lowest level in two or three generations as a share of G.D.P. or that corporate tax revenues as a share of G.D.P. are the lowest among all major countries. One hears only that the statutory corporate tax rate in the United States is high compared with other countries, which is true but not necessarily relevant. The economic importance of statutory tax rates is blown far out of proportion by Republicans looking for ways to make taxes look high when they are quite low."

Can tax rate cuts be paid for by reducing deductions and exemptions?

Tax expenditures (i.e., exclusions, deductions, preferential tax rates, and tax credits) cause revenues to be much lower than they would otherwise be for any given tax rate structure. The benefits from tax expenditures, such as income exclusions for healthcare insurance premiums paid for by employers and tax deductions for mortgage interest, are distributed unevenly across the income spectrum. They are often what the Congress offers to special interests in exchange for their support. According to a report from the CBO that analyzed the 2013 data:
 The top 10 tax expenditures totaled $900 billion. This is a proxy for how much they reduced revenues or increased the annual budget deficit.
 Tax expenditures tend to benefit those at the top and bottom of the income distribution, but less so in the middle.
 The top 20% of income earners received approximately 50% of the benefit from them; the top 1% received 17% of the benefits.
 The largest single tax expenditure was the exclusion from income of employer sponsored health insurance ($250 billion).
 Preferential tax rates on capital gains and dividends were $160 billion; the top 1% received 68% of the benefit or $109 billion from lower income tax rates on these types of income.
Understanding how each tax expenditure is distributed across the income spectrum can inform policy choices.

The Congressional Research Service reported that even though there is more than $1 trillion per year in tax expenditures, it is unlikely that more than $150 billion/year could be cut due to political support for various deductions and exemptions. For example, according to the Tax Policy Center, the home mortgage deduction accounted for $75 billion in foregone revenue in 2011 but over 33 million households (roughly one-third) benefited from it.

Debates about spending

Budget deficits: "spending problem" or "revenue problem"?

Prominent Republican Congressmen have suggested that the federal deficits should be remedied solely with spending cuts, arguing that the U.S. has a "spending problem" not a "revenue problem." President Obama has proposed that the Bush tax cuts should be allowed to expire for the wealthiest taxpayers, while Alan Greenspan has proposed that these tax cuts should expire at all income levels. It is helpful in analyzing this problem to evaluate near-term and long-term fiscal conditions.

Near-term
Taking the last balanced "total" budget in 2001 as a standard, spending has risen by 5.6% GDP, from 18.2% GDP in 2001 to 23.8% GDP in 2010, while revenues declined by 4.6% GDP, from 19.5% GDP to 14.9% GDP over the same interval. By this measure, spending has increased about 1% GDP more than revenues have declined. Using the historical (1971–2008) average spending of 20.6% GDP and revenues of 18.2%, the spending increase of 3.2% GDP is smaller than the revenue decline of 3.3% GDP. In other words, the "spending problem" and "revenue problem" are comparable in size. Recessions typically cause spending to rise on social safety net programs such as unemployment insurance and food stamps, while tax revenues decline due to unemployment and reduced economic activity.

CBO estimated the budget deficit for FY 2012 at 7.0% GDP. The budget deficit in FY 2008 was 3.2% GDP, a difference of 3.8% GDP. FY 2012 revenue of 15.7% GDP was 1.9% below 2008 levels, while FY 2012 spending of 22.7% GDP was 1.9% GDP above 2008 levels, indicating the revenue and spending "problems" were of comparable size.

Nonetheless, federal spending, which peaked under the Reagan administration, has subsequently been in decline as a share of national income. The argument has therefore been made the deficit exists as a result of declining income rather than excessive spending.

Long-term
In the long-run, Medicare and Medicaid are projected to increase dramatically relative to GDP, while other categories of spending are expected to remain relatively constant. The Congressional Budget Office expects Medicare and Medicaid to rise from 5.3% GDP in 2009 to 10.0% in 2035 and 19.0% by 2082. CBO has indicated healthcare spending per beneficiary is the primary long-term fiscal challenge. So in the long-run, spending on these programs is the key issue, far outweighing any revenue consideration. Economist Paul Krugman has made the argument that any serious attempt to tackle long-run deficit problems can be summed up in "seven words: health care, health care, health care, revenue."

The Medicare Trustees provide an annual report of the program's finances. The forecasts from 2009 and 2015 differ materially, mainly due to changes in the projected rate of healthcare cost increases, which have moderated considerably. Rather than rising to nearly 12% GDP over the forecast period (through 2080) as forecast in 2009, the 2015 forecast has Medicare costs rising to 6% GDP, comparable to the Social Security program. Based on the revised forecast, the long-term budget situation has considerably improved. According to Krugman, it is arguable whether there is a long-term entitlements problem.

Earmarks
GAO defines "earmarking" as "designating any portion of a lump-sum amount for particular purposes by means of legislative language." Earmarking can also mean "dedicating collections by law for a specific purpose." In some cases, legislative language may direct federal agencies to spend funds for specific projects. In other cases, earmarks refer to directions in appropriation committee reports, which are not law. Various organizations have estimated the total number and amount of earmarks. An estimated 16,000 earmarks containing nearly $48 billion in spending were inserted into larger, often unrelated bills during 2005. While the number of earmarks has grown in the past decade, the total amount of earmarked funds is approximately 1-2 percent of federal spending.

Fraud, waste and abuse
The Office of Management and Budget estimated that the federal government made $98 billion in "improper payments" during FY2009, an increase of 38% vs. the $72 billion the prior year. This increase was due in part to effects of the financial crisis and improved methods of detection. The total included $54 billion for healthcare-related programs, 9.4% of the $573 billion spent on those programs. The government pledged to do more to combat this problem, including better analysis, auditing, and incentives. During July 2010, President Obama signed into law the Improper Payments Elimination and Recovery Act of 2010, citing approximately $110 billion in unauthorized payments of all types.

Former GAO Director David Walker said in 2008: "Some people think that we can solve our financial problems by stopping fraud, waste and abuse or by canceling the Bush tax cuts or by ending the war in Iraq. The truth is, we could do all three of these things and we would not come close to solving our nation's fiscal challenges."

Stimulus packages

Fiscal stimulus can be characterized as investment, spending or tax cuts. For example, if the funds are used to create a physical asset that generates future cash flows (e.g., a power plant or toll road), the stimulus could be characterized as investment. Extending unemployment benefits are examples of government spending. Tax cuts may or may not be spent. There is significant debate among economists regarding which type of stimulus has the highest "multiplier" (i.e., increase in economic activity per dollar of stimulus). Fiscal stimulus is enacted by laws passed by Congress, which is distinct from monetary policy conducted by central banks such as the U.S. Federal Reserve, which involves interest rates and the money supply.

Recent specific stimulus laws included the Economic Stimulus Act of 2008 and the American Recovery and Reinvestment Act of 2009 (ARRA). The former was primarily tax cuts, while the latter included a blend of tax cuts, investment and spending. The CBO initially estimated that ARRA would increase the federal budget deficit by $185 billion during 2009, by $399 billion in 2010, by $134 billion in 2011, for a total of $787 billion over the 2009-2019 period. The total was later revised to $825 billion.

There is significant debate on whether fiscal stimulus is actually effective in creating jobs and boosting the economy, with critics claiming that all it does is increase the deficit unnecessarily. CBO estimated in August 2011 that ARRA had significant positive effects on GDP and employment. For example, during 2010 the incremental effect on GDP ranged between 1.1 and 4.6 percentage points, the unemployment rate was lowered between 0.7 and 2.0 percentage points, additional employed persons ranged from 1.3 million to 3.6 million, and the number of full-time equivalent jobs added ranged from 1.8 million to 5.2 million. Even after the Act spending stops in 2011, CBO estimated it will increase the number of people employed in 2012 by between 0.4 million and 1.1 million.

Beyond discrete stimulus packages, federal spending tends to increase during recessions due to "automatic stabilizers" such as unemployment compensation and nutrition programs. For example, during May 2010 CBO estimated that "automatic stabilizers added the equivalent of 1.9% of potential GDP to the [2009] deficit, an amount substantially greater than the 0.3% added in 2008. According to CBO's baseline projections, the contribution of automatic stabilizers to the budget deficit will be roughly 2.3% of potential GDP in 2010 and 2.5% of potential GDP in 2011."

Other debate topics

Analyzing debt changes across Presidential terms

Analyzing the impact of a President on budget deficits and debt is challenging. Presidents inherit a "deficit trajectory" from their predecessors. In January each year, CBO publishes its "Budget and Economic Outlook" report which forecasts the deficit and debt changes over the following decade, among other variables. This is referred to as the "current law baseline" which is based on laws in effect at that point time and expected economic conditions. This can be used as a baseline for comparison of actual performance thereafter, bearing in mind economic conditions can change significantly relative to the assumptions made in the initial forecast. Comparing against the initial baseline allows the impact of policies to be isolated.

For example, in January 2001 (when President G.W. Bush was inaugurated) CBO forecast that for fiscal years (FY) 2001-2008 the U.S. would have budget surpluses totaling $3.7 trillion, assuming strong economic conditions would continue. The actual sum of annual deficits (debt) during that period was $1.8 trillion, a $5.5 trillion turn for the worse. This was due to a combination of increased defense spending in the wake of the 9/11 attacks and wars in Afghanistan and Iraq, the Bush tax cuts, and a recession in 2001, offset somewhat by incremental revenue due to a significant housing bubble that built during the period. The major deficit increase in fiscal year 2009 (the last year budgeted by President Bush) reflected the Great Recession. Recall that fiscal year 2009 ran from October 1, 2008 to September 30, 2009. Although that fiscal year overlaps with President Obama's tenure, it could still arguably be included with President Bush's performance. In other words, this analysis could reasonably be conducted for fiscal years 2002-2009 for President Bush, as those are the years he budgeted, which would significantly worsen his performance as the deficit increase in 2009 was $1.4 trillion.

In January 2009 (when President Barack Obama was inaugurated), CBO forecast a $3.7 trillion in total deficit increases (debt) during the FY2009 to 2016 period. However, the actual deficits totaled $7.3 trillion, a $3.6 trillion turn for the worse. This difference was mainly driven by the Great Recession being worse than initially anticipated. Another major driver was resolution of the fiscal cliff. President Obama initially extended the expiration of the Bush tax cuts from 2010 to 2013 to avoid slowing the recovery, then allowed them to expire for the top 1% of income earners in 2013, preserving roughly 80% of the dollar value of the tax cut thereafter. The CBO baseline had assumed their expiration in 2010, so the extension and then partial expiration all added to the deficit relative to the 2009 baseline forecast. The American Recovery and Reinvestment Act (ARRA), the main stimulus bill during the Obama era, was roughly $800 billion of this increase as well.

For comparisons across longer periods of time, the debt-to-GDP ratio is a more effective comparison than comparing raw dollars. Since the country is aging, more recent Presidents are likely to run higher deficits relative to GDP due to higher healthcare and Social Security costs. For example, the current law baseline for President Trump as of January 2017 includes a $10.7 trillion debt increase over the 2018–2027 period, significantly larger than either of his predecessors, with deficits averaging around 5% GDP instead of the historical 3% GDP. This is before consideration of his tax plan, which is represents a $1.5 trillion increase in debt relative to the baseline. Further, comparing dollars across administrations ignores the economic conditions expected at the time. President's Bush and Trump inherited excellent economic conditions, while President Obama did not.

State finances

The U.S. federal government may be required to assist state governments further, as many U.S. states are facing budget shortfalls due to the 2008–2010 recession. The sharp decline in home prices has affected property tax revenue, while the decline in economic activity and consumer spending has led to a falloff in revenues from state sales taxes and income taxes. The Center on Budget and Policy Priorities estimated that the 2010 and 2011 state shortfalls will total $375 billion. As of July 2010, over 30 states had raised taxes, while 45 had reduced services. State and local governments cut 405,000 jobs between January 2009 and February 2011.

GAO estimates that (absent policy changes) state and local governments will face budget gaps that rise from 1% of GDP in 2010 to around 2% by 2020, 2.5% by 2030, and 3.5% by 2040.

Further, many states have underfunded pensions, meaning the state has not contributed the amount estimated to be necessary to pay future obligations to retired workers. The Pew Center on the States reported in February 2010 that states have underfunded their pensions by nearly $1 trillion as of 2008, representing the gap between the $2.35 trillion states had set aside to pay for employees' retirement benefits and the $3.35 trillion price tag of those promises.

Whether a U.S. state can declare bankruptcy, enabling it to re-negotiate its obligations to bondholders, pensioners, and public employee unions is a matter of legal and political debate. Journalist Matt Miller explained some of these issues in February 2011: "The AG [State Attorney General] might put a plan forward and agree to conditions. However, the AG has no say over the legislature. And only a legislature can raise taxes. In some cases, it would require a state constitutional amendment to reduce pensions. Add to this a federal judge who would oversee the process...and a state has sovereign immunity, which means the governor or legislature may simply refuse to go along with anything the judge rules or reject the reorganization plan itself."

Entitlement trust funds

Both Social Security and Medicare are funded by payroll tax revenues dedicated to those programs. Program tax revenues historically have exceeded payouts, resulting in program surpluses and the building of trust fund balances. The trust funds earn interest. Both Social Security and Medicare each have two component trust funds. As of FY2008, Social Security had a combined $2.4 trillion trust fund balance and Medicare's was $380 billion. If during an individual year program payouts exceed the sum of tax income and interest earned during that year (i.e., an annual program deficit), the trust fund for the program is drawn down to the extent of the shortfall. Legally, the mandatory nature of these programs compels the government to fund them to the extent of tax income plus any remaining trust fund balances, borrowing as needed. Once the trust funds are eliminated through expected future deficits, technically these programs can only draw on payroll taxes during the current year. In effect, they are "pay as you go" programs, with additional legal claims to the extent of their remaining trust fund balances.

Credit rating downgrade

In April 2011, rating agency Standard & Poor's (S&P) issued a "negative" outlook on the U.S. "AAA" (highest quality) debt rating for the first time since the rating agency began in 1860, indicating there is a one in three chance of an outright reduction in the rating over the next two years. According to S&P, meaningful progress towards balancing the budget would be required to move the U.S. back to a "stable" outlook. Losing the AAA rating would likely mean higher interest rates and the sale of treasury bonds by entities required to hold AAA securities.

On August 5, 2011, representatives from S&P announced the company's decision to give a first-ever downgrade to U.S. sovereign debt, lowering the rating one notch to "AA+", with a negative outlook. S&P wrote: "The downgrade reflects our opinion that the fiscal consolidation plan that Congress and the Administration recently agreed to falls short of what, in our view, would be necessary to stabilize the government's medium-term debt dynamics...the effectiveness, stability, and predictability of American policy-making and political institutions have weakened at a time of ongoing fiscal and economic challenges to a degree more than we envisioned when we assigned a negative outlook to the rating on April 18, 2011."

See also
 Political debates about United States military bands
 United States debt ceiling
 United States fiscal cliff
 Fiscal sustainability

References

External links
 CBO Budget & Economic Outlook 2017-2027
 CBO Long-Term Budget Outlook-June 2012
 The Hamilton Project-A Dozen Economic Facts About Tax Reform-May 2012
 GAO-U.S. Financial Condition and Fiscal Future Briefing-January 2008
 Commonwealth Club of California-Dr. Yaron Brook and Dr. David Callahan: Is Capitalism Moral? A Debate – October 22, 2012
  
  

United States federal budgets